The 30th European Men's Artistic Gymnastics Championships was held from 23 to 27 May 2012 at Montpellier. The senior and junior events are different. During the senior's qualification the top eight teams progress to the team final, and the top eight gymnasts (two per nation maximum) on each apparatus qualify for the individual finals. After the qualification for the juniors the team medals and places are awarded. Unlike the seniors in this event the top 24 gymnasts (two per nation maximum) compete in the all around final.

Oldest and youngest competitors

Medal winners

Detail results

Seniors

Team 

Oldest and youngest competitors

Floor 

Oldest and youngest competitors

Pommel horse 

Oldest and youngest competitors

Rings 

Oldest and youngest competitors

Vault 

Oldest and youngest competitors

Parallel bars 

Oldest and youngest competitors

Horizontal bar 

Oldest and youngest competitors

Juniors

All round  

Oldest and youngest competitors

Team

Floor

Pommel horse 

Oldest and youngest competitors

Rings 

Oldest and youngest competitors

Vault 

Oldest and youngest competitors

Parallel bars 

Oldest and youngest competitors

Horizontal bar 

Oldest and youngest competitors

Medal count

Combined

Seniors

Juniors

References

External links

2012
Sport in Montpellier
International gymnastics competitions hosted by France
European Men's Artistic Gymnastics Championships
European Men's Artistic Gymnastics Championships
2012 in European sport